Limonium ramosissimum, the Algerian sea lavender, is a species of sea lavender (Limonium) native to the Mediterranean region.
Its specific epithet  means "many-branched" in Latin.

Ecological characteristics
As a halophyte, Limonium ramosissimum has the ability to tolerate a wide range of salt levels (salinity-tolerant) in the soil and also has the ability to actively lower the soil salinity by taking up and excreting salt through glands in the inflorescence, which are then free to break off and blow away. This could have the effect of changing the species composition of an area by reducing salinity in the soil.

Invasive species
These plants are also very fecund, producing many seeds, and are also able to compete with native flora. It has escaped cultivation and become an invasive species in salt marshes of California.

Subspecies
Limonium ramosissimum subsp. provinciale

References

ramosissimum
Halophytes